2004 Pekan Olahraga Nasional or the Pekan Olahraga Nasional XVI were a major multi-sport event in Indonesia which took place in South Sumatra, from 2 September to 14 September 2004. A total of 607 events in 41 sports were competed among more than 5,500 athletes from 30 provinces, with the newly created province of Riau Islands only as observer and did not send any athletes. The games also staged 8 paralympic sports.

Jakarta topped the medal table for the tenth time in the history of the games.

Sports

Aerospace games
Aquatics
Diving
Swimming
Synchronized swimming
Water polo
Archery
Athletics
Badminton
Basketball
Billiards
Bowling
Boxing
Chess
Climbing
Contract bridge
Cycling
Fencing
Football
Golf
Gymnastics
Artistic
Rhythmic
Aerobic
Hockey
Judo
Karate
Kenpo
Pencak silat
Motorcycling
Roller skating
Rowing
Sailing
Sepak takraw
Shooting
Squash
Table tennis
Taekwondo
Tarung Derajat
Tennis
Volleyball
Indoor
Beach
Water skiing
Weightlifting
Wrestling
Wushu

Medal table

Pekan Olahraga Nasional
Pekan Olahraga Nasional
2004 in Indonesian sport